Health First Europe (HFE) is a non-profit, non-commercial alliance of patients, healthcare workers, academics and healthcare experts as well as the medical technology industry. Its aim is to ensure equitable access to modern, innovative and reliable medical technology for all European citizens, and uphold that healthcare is regarded as a vital investment in the future of Europe. For this, it works together with all health stakeholders at the European level. HFE is based in Brussels and has 20 member organisations as well as ten individual members.

HFE is a registered AISBL with Belgian authorities.

Core messages
Health First Europe promotes four core beliefs:
 There are weaknesses in European healthcare systems; a rethink is required in order to meet current and future health challenges.
 Patients and clinicians should have equitable access to modern, innovative and reliable medical technology.
 The development of new and flexible modes of healthcare delivery will benefit both patients and healthcare providers.
 "Health equals wealth". Health is a productive economic factor in terms of employment, innovation and economic growth.

Members

Organisations
 EFCCA - European Federation of Crohn's and Ulcerative Colitis Associations
 EIWH – European Institute of Women's’ Health
 EPF – European Patients Forum
 IAPO – International Association of Patients organisations
 IDF-Europe - International Diabetes Federation – Europe
 EBIS - European Brain Injury Society
 EFORT - European Federation of National Associations of Orthopaedics and Traumatology
 EHTEL - European Health Telematics Society
 EMA – European Medical Association
 ESC - European Society of Cardiology
 EUROFEDOP - European Federation of Public Service Employees Unions
 ISFR - International Society for Fracture Repair
 UEHP - European Union of Private Hospitals
 MTG - The Medical Technology Group
 Aktion Meditech
 Eucomed – European Medical Technology Industry Association
 European Academy of Science and Arts
 European Institute of Medicine
 Institute for Health Economics
 ISO - International Organization for Standardization

Associate Member Organisations
 EFN – European Federation of Nurses Associations

Individual Members
 Prof. Dr. Günter Neubauer – Professor of Economics and Social Policy, University of the Bundeswehr, Germany
 Prof. Dr. David Williams – Professor of Tissue Engineering and Head of the Department of Clinical Engineering, University of Liverpool, United Kingdom
 Prof. Dr. Martin Fried - Head of the Clinical Centre for Minimally Invasive Surgery and Bariatric Surgery ISCARE Hospital and Professor of Surgery at the Charles University in Prague; founding member of the International Federation for the Surgery of Obesity (IFSO); and member of the Executive Board of the Czech Obesity Society
 Prof. Elias Mossialos - Professor of Health Policy and co-Director of the Health and Social Care Department, London School of Economics and Political Science, United Kingdom
 Joseph Putzeys – European Commission, DG Enterprise, Advisor hors classe
 Michael Holman - Journalist and Parkinson’s Disease sufferer
 Carlo Ramponi - Head Responsible for Quality in the Lombardia Region and Managing director of Joint Commission International
 Dr. Thomas Meyer - University of Hamburg, Germany; expert on Chlamydia
  Judy Birch - Chair of an independent support group for endometriosis and pelvic pain patients; founding member of the Endometriosis All Party Parliamentary Group in the UK and of the European Endometriosis Alliance
 Sebastian Rohde - Advisor

References

European medical and health organizations
Organizations established in 2004
International organisations based in Belgium